Shivasharane Nambekka is a 1955 Indian Kannada-language film directed by P. Neelakantan.

Plot
The film depicts the life story of Saint Nambiyakka, a great devotee of Lord Shiva.

Cast
B. R. Panthulu
M. V. Rajamma
Dikki Madhava Rao
Revathi

Production
The film was produced by B. R. Panthulu under his own banner Padmini Pictures and was directed by P. Neelakantan.

The film was dubbed into Tamil with the title Sivasakthi and was released in 1956.

Soundtrack
The music was composed by T. G. Lingappa for both Kannada and Tamil versions.

Kannada Songs
"Parama Jaanavara" - Jikki - 03:05
"Shambho Mahaadeva" - Seergazhi Govindarajan - 03:25

Tamil Songs
"Sundara Vadhaname" - N. L. Ganasaraswathi - 03:13
"Maayaa Valaiyil Veezhndhu" - N. L. Ganasaraswathi - 03:38
"Jeeva Paripalana" - Jikki - 2:51

References

External links

Hindu mythological films
Hindu devotional films
Films scored by T. G. Lingappa
1950s Kannada-language films
Indian black-and-white films